The Bosawás Biosphere Reserve in the northern part of state Jinotega (border with Honduras), Nicaragua is a hilly tropical forest designated in 1997 as a UNESCO biosphere reserve. At approximately 20,000 km² (2 million hectares) in size, the reserve (i.e. nucleus plus buffer zone) comprises about 15% of the nation's total land area. Combined with the biosphere of the banana river in Honduras, which is continguous with the jungle of the Bosawás reserve, it is the second largest rainforest in the Western Hemisphere, after the Amazon in Brazil. Bosawás is largely unexplored, and is extremely rich in biodiversity.

History
Bosawás overlaps the homelands of two of Nicaragua's indigenous peoples, the Mayangna and the Miskito, in an area which is rich in natural resources, most notably timber and gold. About 130,000 inhabitants practice subsistence farming within the boundaries, about 35,000 of them indigenous Miskito and Mayangna people.

The Bosawás Biosphere Reserve developed over time out of conflicts between the Sandanista government and indigenous Miskitu and Mayangna. As part of the peace process coming out of armed conflict between the Sandanistas and the Mayangna and Miskitu, the Nicaraguan government signed the 1987 Autonomy Law of the Atlantic Coast of Nicaragua (Law 28) that formally recognized indigenous and afro-descendant communities' territorial rights in the region. The subsequent Chamorro government set aside three large reserves, Bosawás being the largest, with its nucleus comprising approximately 7% of Nicaragua's total land area (the rest constitutes the reserve's buffer zone). The creation of Bosawás, declared without indigenous consultation, was initially considered a violation of the region's constitutionally guaranteed territorial autonomy.  However, after negotiation and consultation with local Mayangna and Miskitu communities, by the late 90s, indigenous territorial boundaries were demarcated, title was granted to the indigenous communities, and the idea of Bosawas as a biosphere reserve was embraced. 

In January 2020, as part of an ongoing series of murders of indigenous people in Bosawas over land conflicts, several Mayangna people living in Bosawas were killed and kidnapped by mestizo settlers (colonos) seeking to steal indigenous land.  This has repeated many times, ie the August 2021 massacre of 9 indigenous people and sexual assaults of indigenous women in Sauni As.

Etymology
The name is derived from three natural features: The Bocay River, Mount Saslaya and the Waspuk River.  It includes all of Nicaragua's Saslaya National Park. The Cordillera Isabella cross the reserve area, and the Coco River forms the northern border with Honduras.

Flora and fauna
About an estimated of 10,000 km² of forest occur in Bosawas.

The botanical diversity of Bosawás is very high, with vascular plants considered to be in the thousands. Bosawás also is rich in invertebrate and vertebrate taxa. Within Bosawás live an estimated 100,000 to 200,000 insect species; the number is believed to be higher, however a closer estimate is not possible due to the area being relatively unexplored. Quetzals and guacamayas are present in significant numbers, along with the largest and most powerful eagle found in the Americas, the harpy eagle (Harpia harpyja). These, however, are just a few of the 700 Nicaraguan bird species potentially found in the reserve. Pumas and jaguars, considered powerful top predators of the food chain, are present in the reserve, and tapirs (Tapirus bairdii) are their favorite prey.

See also
National System of Protected Areas (Nicaragua)
Protected areas of Nicaragua
Wildlife of Nicaragua

References

External links
  Nature Conservancy web page on the Bosawas Biosphere Reserve

  MARENA Page of the Reserve Bosawas

Biosphere reserves of Nicaragua
Geography of Nicaragua
Protected areas of Nicaragua
Central American montane forests
Central American Atlantic moist forests